Ingrid Gosch (born 2 October 1949) is an Austrian fencer. She competed in the women's team foil event at the 1972 Summer Olympics.

References 

1949 births
Living people
Austrian female foil fencers
Olympic fencers of Austria
Fencers at the 1972 Summer Olympics